Franc or Frank Reyes may refer to:

Franc Reyes (film director), American film director
Franc Reyes (illustrator), Filipino illustrator and comic strip artist
Frank Reyes (born 1969), born Francisco López Reyes, bachata artist
Franc Reyes, songwriter "Never Say Never" and "Together Forever"

See also
Frank Reys (c.1931–1984), Aboriginal Australian jockey
Francisco Reyes (disambiguation)